Dale Raymond Last (born 25 February 1964) is an Australian politician. He has been the Liberal National member for Burdekin in the Queensland Legislative Assembly since 2015.

Before his election to state parliament, he was a councillor (even serving as Deputy Mayor) for the City of Townsville, and prior to that a police officer.

Dale has a Bachelor of Arts from Central Queensland University, and was the recipient of the National Police Medal in 1998.

References

1964 births
Living people
Members of the Queensland Legislative Assembly
Liberal National Party of Queensland politicians
Australian police officers
Queensland local councillors
Central Queensland University alumni
21st-century Australian politicians